Vinograd is a rural locality (a village) in Zelentsovskoye Rural Settlement, Nikolsky District, Vologda Oblast, Russia. The population was 53 as of 2002.

Geography 
The distance to Nikolsk is 82 km, to Zeletsovo is 12 km. Kachug is the nearest rural locality.

References 

Rural localities in Nikolsky District, Vologda Oblast